Frances Healy (born 24 August 1970) is an Irish actress, comedian, radio personality, TV presenter and voice-over artist.

She graduated from Trinity College Dublin in 1999. Theatre performances include The First Cosmonaut with Blue Raincoat Theatre and The Candidate at The Beltable, Limerick; and Bewleys Café Dublin; The Big Beautiful Woman, as part of Limerick City of Culture 2014; Desert Storm and Misterman at the Royal Scottish Academy of Music, The Birds at The Abbey,  Vagina Monologues and Her Big Chance at The Cottiers Theatre Glasgow and was part of Limericks “favourite Play” the critically acclaimed Alone It Stands by John Breen on the Australian tour.

Film and television credits include Moone Boy for  SKY Television, A Time to Dance (BBC), River City (BBC) Taggart (ITV), Camera Café, Fair City (RTE) and The Magdalene Sisters (MIRAMAX) by Peter Mullen in which she played Sr. Jude.

Healy is also a voice-over artist and has recorded voice-overs world-wide including the USA, Norway, the UK and Ireland. She has recorded voice-overs for H&M, Boots and many several ad campaigns for TV, film and radio. She also co-hosted a mid-week breakfast show with Fred MacAulay for BBC Radio Scotland.

She was the winner of the best new comedy act at The Govan Celtic Fringe Festival in 2004 and a semi finalist in Channel 4 "So You Think Your Funny" competition. After winning best new comedy act at Govan Celtic Comedy festival, Frances was a regular on the stand-up circuit for over 8 years. She has appeared in stand up venues all over the UK, including Jongleurs in Glasgow, Edinburgh and London, The Stand Comedy Club in both Glasgow and Edinburgh, Comedy Café, Banana Cabaret and The Comedy Store in London. In 2022, she starred in "Red Army" at the Lime Tree Theatre, Limerick.

In 2015, she set up a school of acting in Limerick, called "Acting Up in Limerick".

Filmography

References

External links
  
 Profile on "Mandy" website
 

1970 births
Living people
Irish television actresses
Actresses from Limerick (city)